Puthukkudiyiruppu Central College ( Putukkuṭiyiruppu Mattiya Kallūri) is a provincial school in Puthukkudiyiruppu, Sri Lanka.

History 
The school was founded on 5 January 1955 by the Hindu Vittiya Development Association with the name Srisubramanya Vidyalayam. M. Nesaratnam was the school's first principal. Initially it had classes from grade one to grade ten but was later expanded to Advanced Level. he school currently contains classes from grade six to Advanced Level. The school's golden jubilee in 2005 was celebrated with the support of old students and an auditorium was donated to the school by old students from the United Kingdom. The first old students association for this college out of the country established with an administration body in year 2000 April created by Initiator and founder member Mr Murugaiah Sangarapillai at UK.

See also
 List of schools in Northern Province, Sri Lanka

References

External links
 Puthukkudiyiruppu Central College

Educational institutions established in 1955
Provincial schools in Sri Lanka
Schools in Mullaitivu District
1955 establishments in Ceylon